John Wotton (by 1523 – 1555 or later), of Totnes and Great Englebourne, Devon, was an English politician.

He was a Member (MP) of the Parliament of England for Totnes in March 1553 and October 1553.

References

Year of death missing
Members of the Parliament of England (pre-1707) for Totnes
English MPs 1553 (Edward VI)
English MPs 1553 (Mary I)
Year of birth uncertain